Antonios or Antónios is a Greek masculine given name that is a variant of Antonis, as well as a surname. Notable people with this name include the following:

Given name
Antonios Antoniadis (born 20th-century), Greek physician
Antonios Antonopoulos (1805–1887), Greek politician
Antonios Aronis (born 1957), Greek water polo player
Antonios Asimakopoulos (born 1976), Greek basketball player
Antonios Eparchos (1491–1571), Greek humanist, soldier and poet
Antonios Fokaidis (born 1989), Greek swimmer
Antonios Georgantas (1799 - 1884), Greek Major General
Antonios Georgoulis (born 1928), Greek wrestler
Antonios Giannoulas (born 1976), Greek boxer
Antonios Gioulbas (born 1986), Greek swimmer
Antonios Gryllos (1917 – 1993), Greek wrestler
Antonios Kalamogdartis (1810–1856), Greek politician
Antonios Karyofyllis (1904 – 1989), Greek athlete
Antonios Katinaris (1931 – 1999), Greek musician
Antonios Keramopoulos (1870 – 1960), Greek archaeologist
Antonios Komizopoulos (fl. 19th-century), Greek merchant
Antonios Kounadis (born 1937), Greek discus athlete
Antonios Kriezis (1796–1865), Greek military officer
Antonios Mangos (1910  – 1940/1941), Greek middle-distance athlete
Antonios Mastoras (born 1991), Greek high jump athlete
Antonios Mavromichalis (1792–1873), Greek revolutionary, military officer and politician
Antonios Miaoulis (1800 – 1836), Greek politician
Antonios Mikos, Greek-American biomedical engineer
Antonios Miliarakis (1841 – 1905), Greek geographer and historian
Antonios Sajih Mokbel, known as Tony Mokbel (born 1965), Australian criminal
Antonios Naguib (born 1935), Egyptian cardinals
Antonios Nikopolidis (born 1971), Greek footballer
Antonios Papadakis (1810–1878), Greek merchant
Antonios Papadopoulos (born 1999), German footballer
Antonios Papadopoulos (wrestler) (born 1964), Greek wrestler
Antonios Papaioannou, Greek gymnast
Antonios Pepanos (1866 - 1918), Greek swimmer
Antonios Trakatellis (born 1931), Greek politician and biochemist
Antonios Tsakiropoulos (born 1969), Greek volleyball player
Antonios Varthalitis (1924 – 2007), Greek Roman Catholic Archbishop
Antonios Vlontakis (born 1975), Greek water polo player
Antonios Grigorios Voutsinos (1891 – 1968), Greek Roman Catholic archbishops
Antonios Vouzas (born 1993), Greek footballer
Antonios Zavaliangos, American material scientist and engineer
Antonios Zois (1869–1941), Greek chieftain

Middle name
Markos Antonios Katsaitis (1717 – 1787), Greek scholar, geographer and lawyer

Surname
Abune Antonios (1927–2022), Oriental Orthodox archbishops

See also

Andonios Liveralis
Antonio, given name
Antonis, name

Notes

Masculine given names
Greek masculine given names